, is a 2011 Japanese animated supernatural film series consisting of six films and directed by Umanosuke Iida. The first film in the series was released in theaters on  June 18, 2011 and the last on November 26, 2011. The film series has been licensed by Sentai Filmworks in North America.

Plot
 
In a futuristic Tokyo, unique human beings who have awakened distinct powers are being hunted by a secret organization named Custos. Known as "Attractors", these exceptional humans are joining forces to defend themselves. They are led by a boy named Quon, an idealist who is determined to save all the Attractors he can.

Cast

Attractors

The protagonist, Quon has actually lived for over a millennium. Born in a village that was home to the first Attractors, Quon's powers manifest when he witnesses his family being slaughtered and avenges them while enraged. His younger brother Towa sealed himself away into the crystal known as the Tokitsu Namida and gave Quon immortality. Quon never knew this until in chapter 5, when he regained consciousness and found himself in the room Kannazuki was hiding. He now aims to pave the way for a future of peace and acceptance. Unlike the Attractors seen thus far, he has more than one power, including transforming into a fighting form designated by Custos as Insania. In that state, Quon has exceptional speed and strength, manipulations of water, metal (or mechanical objects) and, possibly nature itself, and self-regeneration. In Chapter 6, Towa unsealed Quon's true form and powers so he could defeat Kamishiro at the cost of Towa's life. Afterwards, Quon seems to have lost his immortality. His full name is Quon Miduchi (三鎚久遠).

A flirty, risque attractor, and friend of Quon. She has exceptional speed, or something to that effect. Although she cares about the exterior, she is not completely self-centered, aiding her friends in times of need. Like some attractors, her powers are limited. She is able to maintain super speed for at least twenty minutes before tiring, and wears a special suit to protect her skin from rashes caused by her velocity. Her full name is Yuriko Akatsuki (暁由里子).

A young, innocent girl whose power is her voice. With it, she can heal, or destroy. Her power fluctuates with her emotions, and seem to have their limits the more she uses them. Kiri's parents died in a fire, so she currently lives with her grandmother. Her full name is Kiri Jougasaki (城ヶ崎綺璃).

A humble woman, especially towards Quon (through use of honorific expression--sama). Tei has telepathic abilities that allow her to communicate with others from afar. But left out of her control, her power can cause chaos by having people relive hurtful memories. In Chapter 4, it was thought she has romantic feelings for Shun, but however, the character designer Toshihiro Kawamoto and producer Makoto Watanabe has dismissed this, and has said that Shun and Tei's relationships are platonic rather than romantic, according to a radio interview by Sokoani. Her full name is Tei Ryumonji (龍紋寺薙).

A young, animal loving girl who carries a notepad and pencils for sketching. She has the power to communicate to animals, and is constantly surrounded by them, which are adorned with a tiny pink bow. Her Power Limiter enables her to speak normally, though she usually talks in the language of an animal. Her full name is Miu Misaki (美咲深夕).

Takao is a complacent, somewhat lazy, smart talking attractor. He's always criticizing Quon about his avid attempts to save all the attractors, but still has an immense amount of respect for him. Although he doesn't seem to care, he uses his powers when absolutely necessary. Takao is a teleporter, with adverse effects. When he teleports, he injures himself, resulting in a twisted limb, or a broken bone. His full name is Takao Senba (千場たかお).

An intelligent, support-type attractor. Ryō is a technopath, able to control technology at his whim, infiltrating video feeds, disabling security systems, preventing tracking to some degree. When he uses his power, four probes come out of his back, and aid him in his exploits. He is usually seen with Miu. His full name is Ryou Sakamaki (坂巻亮).

A young and naive boy whose power is not titled. When he gets upset or angry, his body transforms into a goliath-like creature who erupts with colored orbs. Although he can't control the orbs, they usually fly off toward the general direction of the aggressor. When the orbs come into contact with objects, they disintegrate matter, leaving crater-sized holes in their wake. Thanks to Quon, he finally came to understand his powers. In chapter 5, he also demonstrated the ability to create barriers. His full name is Yuma Kazui. (数井勇馬).

A kind gardener and caretaker. He does not have any powers. He is a part of the Order, which is the group that controls Custos. His family were protecting the Tokitsu Namida, which is a crystal containing Quon's younger brother, Towa, and is protecting Quon himself. His full name is Seiji Kannazuki (神無月星志)

The doctor in the Attractors' team. Just like Kannazuki, she doesn't have any powers. Her full name is Midori Wakatsuki (若月みどり).

 A 21-year-old Attractor with fire manipulative powers who was originally with the Custos as the cyborg soldier designated Epsilon. He is generally a pure and naive person, yet the events that led him to becoming a member of the WTOC made him slightly bitter. Prior to joining Custos, Shun was a high school student with a younger sister who was also a Larva like he was. When she entered a Larvae Burst stage, Shun's own Attractor powers activated and he unknowingly incinerated her as well as their parents. Unable to bear the trauma, before enlisting in the WTOC program Shun placed himself under the delusion that his sister was murdered by the creature that is her Attractor form and saw all Attractors as monsters that deserve to die. However, during the events where he is in a world based on his dreams with Tei, who resembles his sister, Shun regains his memories of how she truly died. As a result, he underwent a Larvae Burst with his cyborg parts enhancing his Attractor abilities as he gains full control of himself without a power limiter. He defected from Custos and joined the Attractors, realizing their true intentions while managing to win their trust after saving Tei and Kiri from the Custos. He sacrifices himself in chapter 6 in order to open the blocked path to save Tei and the others, escaping from the Custos building as it collapses, leaving his last words "A human's possibility is unlimited".

Quon's younger brother from 1,000 years ago, believing that they should use their powers to help others despite what their village said. Towa's powers amplifies others. In chapter 5, Kamishiro wanted Towa's powers to further increase his own. His full name is Towa Miduchi (三鎚永久)

Custos

The commander of Custos, a cold-hearted man who claims that the capture and killing of Larvae is for the sake of order. However, Kamishiro is actually a Larva who can take the powers of others as his own before he decided to abuse his power for world domination. In Chapter 6, he absorbed a portion of Towa's powers and tried to turn all the humans in the facility into Larvae. He was defeated by Quon when Towa overloaded Quon's powers and lost all of his abilities because of it.

In the official website, it is revealed he is 35 years old and 183 centimeters tall. He was destroyed by Shun in Chapter 6.

Originally a 28-year-old American named Harry, he was scouted by Alpha for the WTOC program.

Originally a 27-year-old Frenchman named Ray, he was scouted for the WTOC program. He often reads books when off duty. He was destroyed by Shun in Chapter 6.

The second newest member of the Custos, and the only female cyborg in the WTOC. Hizuru is the shortest among the army, being , as well as the second youngest by age 22. She has feelings for Shun, his defection causing her to start doubting Custos's methods. In chapter 5, she becomes confused after what Shun said to her which is affecting her ability to do her missions. In Chapter 6, she is forced to fight Shun via control device. She intervenes in the fight between Shun and Alpha and is mortally wounded, shutting down as she finally understands what Shun fought for and now knows humanity was more important than the ideal order Custos envisions.

Episodes
 : 18 June 2011
 : 16 July 2011
 : 13 August 2011
 : 10 September 2011
 : 5 November 2011
 : 26 November 2011

See also
 Japanese films of 2011

Notes

References

External links
 
 

2011 anime films
Bones (studio)
Fantasy anime and manga
Fantasy film series
Sentai Filmworks
Films scored by Kenji Kawai
Animated film series